Z43 was a Type 1936B destroyer built for the Kriegsmarine (German Navy) during World War II. Completed in mid-1944, the ship spent the war in the Baltic Sea, escorting German ships, laying minefields, and bombarding Soviet forces. She was badly damaged by a mine on 10 April 1945, and scuttled on 3 May of that same year.

Design and description
The Type 1936B design retained the hull design of the Type 1936A, but reverted to the lighter main armament of the Type 1936 to reduce topweight and improve seakeeping. Their crew consisted of 11–15 officers and 305–20 sailors.

The Type 1936B ships carried five  SK C/34 guns in single mounts with gun shields, two each superimposed, fore and aft of the superstructure. The fifth mount was positioned on top of the rear deckhouse. The guns were designated No. 1 to 5 from front to rear. Their anti-aircraft armament consisted of four  SK C/30 guns in two twin mounts abreast the rear funnel and fifteen  C/38 guns in three quadruple and three single mounts. The ship carried eight above-water  torpedo tubes in two power-operated mounts. Two reloads were provided for each mount. They had four depth charge launchers and mine rails could be fitted on the rear deck that had a maximum capacity of 74–76 mines. 'GHG' (Gruppenhorchgerät) passive hydrophones were fitted to detect submarines and a S-Gerät sonar was also probably fitted. The ships were equipped with a FuMO 24 search radar above the bridge.

Construction and career
Z43 was originally ordered as a Type 1938B destroyer from AG Weser (Deschimag) on 28 June 1939, but the contract was cancelled when the Type 1938B design was abandoned, and the ship was reordered as a Type 1936A (Mob) destroyer. That was changed to a Type 1936B on 17 February 1941. She was laid down as yard number W1029 on 1 May 1942 at Deschimag's Bremen shipyard, launched on 22 September 1943 and commissioned on 31 May 1944 under the command of Fregattenkapitän (Commander) Carl Heinrich Lampe. After working up Z43 was assigned to the 6. Zerstörerflotille (6th Destroyer Flotilla) in October 1944.

The following month, the flotilla and the heavy cruisers  and  shelled Soviet positions during the evacuation of Sworbe, on the Estonian island of Saaremaa, between 20 and 24 November. In mid-December, the 6. T23 was to escort the other ships and the destroyers were laden with 68 mines each. The mission was postponed to the night of 11/12 December because of bad weather and the flotilla sailed on the morning of the 11th. The weather gradually worsened over the course of the day and the spray and rain made navigation difficult. They both struck mines and sank around 02:00; so close to the minefield, no effort was made to rescue any survivors in the darkness.

In January and early February 1945, Z43 escorted convoys between Gotenhafen, Germany, and Libau, Latvia. Between 18 and 24 February, German forces launched a local counterattack in Samland; Admiral Scheer, Z43, and other ships provided artillery support, targeting Soviet positions near Peyse and Gross-Heydekrug. The German attack temporarily restored the land connection to Königsberg. On 27 February, the ship helped to escort the ocean liner  to Sassnitz. Z43 escorted Admiral Scheer and her sister Lützow from Danzig Bay to Swinemünde on 7 March and then bombarded Soviet positions near Kolberg from 11 to 18 March to cover the evacuation of the city. From 23 March to 7 April, the ship escorted Lützow and other German ships in Danzig Bay while also bombarding Soviet troops.

Z43 was struck by a Soviet bomb that failed to detonate on 9 April, but she struck a mine the following day. The explosion blew a  hole in her hull, broke her keel, and flooded the centre and aft boiler rooms. The torpedo boat  began a tow, but the destroyer was later able to steam under her own power to Rostock for emergency repairs that included welding several beams to the hull to strengthen it. Z43 then steamed into Warnemünde harbour to provide gunfire support for German troops ashore after having off-loaded all of her anti-aircraft guns and some of her crew. She departed Warnemünde on 2 May for Kiel, having exhausted all of her ammunition. The ship was scuttled near Flensburg the following day.

Notes

Citations

Bibliography

External links
Z43 on german-navy.de
German Destroyers on Battleships-Cruisers.co.uk

Type 1936B destroyers
Ships built in Bremen (state)
1944 ships
Maritime incidents in May 1945
Scuttled vessels of Germany